The Henry Girls are an Irish folk and roots music group. The band consists of three sisters: Karen, Lorna and Joleen McLaughlin. All three have studied music at university level and are multi-instrumentalist, utilizing fiddles, ukulele, banjo, guitar, harp, mandolin, piano, and accordion. The Henry Girls often sing in harmony and their sound has been described as a mix of traditional Irish folk music and Americana. They have contributed backup vocals to Mary Black's album Stories from the Steeples. They have also collaborated with Session Americana, Dónal Lunny, Moya Brennan, Jennifer Kimball, and The Fox Hunt.

History

The McLaughlin sisters are from Malin in Inishowen, County Donegal, in Ulster, Ireland. They formed the band over 10 years ago. They named the band after their grandfather. They released their debut album, Between Us, in 2003, and was produced by Máire Breatnach. They released their album Dawn in 2010, and that year they were nominated for an Irish Film and Television Award for Best Original Score for the film A Shine of Rainbows, which featured songs from the album Dawn.

December Moon

In 2011 they released their album December Moon. The album features all original songs but four, including a cover of Elvis Costello's "Watching the Detectives." It was produced by Calum Malcolm.

Louder Than Words

In early 2014, the trio released the album Louder than Words.

Members

Discography

Albums

Singles

References

External links

Official website
"Malin’s Henry Girls launch fourth album" from the Derry Journal

Americana music groups
Irish folk musical groups
All-female bands
Musical groups from County Donegal
You're a Star contestants
Sibling musical trios